John Rockford "Rocky" Hill (December 1, 1946 – April 10, 2009) was an American blues guitarist, singer, and bassist from Dallas, Texas, United States.  Hill was the older brother of ZZ Top bassist, Dusty Hill.

Biography
Hill was a member of the 1960s acid rock and blues group American Blues with his brother Dusty and drummer Frank Beard.  Before the formation of ZZ Top, Rocky left the trio and subsequently played in blues bands for John Lee Hooker, Lightnin' Hopkins (for whom he played bass), Freddie King, and Jimmy Reed.

In 1982, he released his first solo album, Texas Shuffle (reissued in 2005) which featured Johnny Winter and Dr. John. In 1988, Virgin Records released Hill's eponymous album produced by ZZ Top's manager and producer Bill Ham.

Hill, a self-styled "anti-Clapton", was called "a monster on guitar" and "perhaps the wildest and scariest—both on stage and off—of all the white-boy Texas blues guitarists" and was noted in particular for his "metal-melting tone and whistling, artillery-shell harmonics".

Hill died on April 10, 2009, aged 62.

Discography

Albums
Texas Shuffle (1982)
Rocky Hill (1988)
Midnight Creepers (1994) 
Lone Star Legend (released 2012, recorded 1977)

Guest appearances
"German Mustard" (1972) – track three on The Late Great Townes Van Zandt  
Extended Play (1973) – four track EP by Don Sanders
"The Real Good Thing" (2006) – track 5 on the album Straight Ahead by Joe Miranda and the Wildcatters

References

External links
Review of Rocky Hill
John Lomax talks to Otis Gibbs about Rocky Hill

1946 births
2009 deaths
American blues guitarists
American male guitarists
American blues singers
Texas blues musicians
Musicians from Dallas
20th-century American singers
20th-century American guitarists
Guitarists from Texas
20th-century American male musicians